Patellofemoral (sometimes femoropatellar) refers to relations between the patella and the femur, such as:
Knee, including the "Patellofemoral joint"
Patellofemoral pain syndrome
Medial collateral ligament - the "Medial patellofemoral ligament"